The 2005–06 Portland Trail Blazers season was the team's 36th in the NBA and their first with new coach Nate McMillan. The team began the season hoping to improve upon their 27–55 output from the previous season. However, they came up six games shy of tying it, finishing 21–61 and failing to qualify for the playoffs for the third straight season.

Draft picks

Roster

Regular season

Season standings

z - clinched division title
y - clinched division title
x - clinched playoff spot

Record vs. opponents

Game log

Player statistics

Awards and records

Transactions

References

Portland Trail Blazers seasons
Portland Trail Blazers 2005
Port0
Port
Port
Portland Trail Blazers